A statue of Harrison Gray Otis (sometimes called General Harrison Gray Otis) is installed in Los Angeles' MacArthur Park, in the U.S. state of California. The bronze statue is part of a sculptural group (sometimes called the "Otis Group") which includes a newsboy and, originally, a soldier.

References

External links
 

Bronze sculptures in California
Monuments and memorials in Los Angeles
Outdoor sculptures in Greater Los Angeles
Sculptures of men in California
Statues in Los Angeles
Westlake, Los Angeles